In anatomy, buccopharyngeal structures are those pertaining to the cheek and the pharynx or to the mouth and the pharynx.

It may refer to:

 Buccopharyngeal membrane
 Buccopharyngeal fascia

Anatomy